The 2004 Qatar motorcycle Grand Prix was the thirteenth round of the 2004 MotoGP Championship. It took place on the weekend of 30 September-2 October 2004 at the Losail International Circuit. It was the first running of the event.

This would be Sete Gibernau 9th and his final race win.

MotoGP classification

250 cc classification

125 cc classification
The race produced a dead heat for first place between Jorge Lorenzo and Andrea Dovizioso. After a photo finish could not separate the riders, Lorenzo was awarded first place on the basis that he set a faster laptime during the race.

Championship standings after the race (motoGP)

Below are the standings for the top five riders and constructors after round thirteen has concluded.

Riders' Championship standings

Constructors' Championship standings

 Note: Only the top five positions are included for both sets of standings.

Notes

References

Qatar motorcycle Grand Prix
Qatar
Motorcycle Grand Prix